The 2018 Ulster Senior Football Championship was the 130th instalment of the annual Ulster Senior Football Championship organised by Ulster GAA. It is one of the four provincial competitions of the 2018 All-Ireland Senior Football Championship. The winners receive The Anglo-Celt Cup. The draw for the championship was made on 19 October 2017.

Tyrone were the defending champions, though were eliminated in the quarter-finals. The championship was won by Donegal who defeated Fermanagh in the final. Donegal full-forward Patrick McBrearty suffered a season-ending cruciate ligament injury in the final. DUP leader Arlene Foster notably attended the final.

Teams
The Ulster championship is contested by the nine county teams in the province of Ulster.

Championship draw

Preliminary round

Quarter-finals

Semi-finals

Final

2018 Irish News Ulster Allstars
 Rory Beggan (Monaghan)
 Pádraig Hampsey (Tyrone)
 Drew Wylie (Monaghan)
 Ryan Wylie (Monaghan)
 Eoghan Bán Gallagher (Donegal)
 Mattie Donnelly (Tyrone)
 Karl O'Connell (Monaghan)
 Colm Cavanagh (Tyrone)
 Michael Murphy (Donegal)
 Ryan McAnespie (Monaghan)
 Niall Sludden (Tyrone)
 Ryan McHugh (Donegal)
 Connor McAliskey (Tyrone)
 Seán Quigley (Fermanagh)
 Conor McManus (Monaghan)

See also
 2018 All-Ireland Senior Football Championship
 2018 Connacht Senior Football Championship
 2018 Leinster Senior Football Championship
 2018 Munster Senior Football Championship

References

External links
 http://ulster.gaa.ie/

2U
2018 in Northern Ireland sport
Ulster Senior Football Championship